is a 1953 Japanese drama film written and directed by Kaneto Shindo.

Cast

References

External links
 

1953 films
Japanese drama films
1950s Japanese-language films
1953 drama films
Films directed by Kaneto Shindo
Films based on short fiction
Films based on works by Guy de Maupassant
Japanese black-and-white films
1950s Japanese films